Pierre Dufour d'Astafort (6 February 1886 – 11 November 1957) was a French equestrian and Olympic medalist. He was born in Le Mans, the son of Baron François Dufour d'Astafort and Marguerite de Cantillon. He competed in show jumping at the 1912 Summer Olympics, where he won a silver medal with the French team, along with Gaston Seigner, Jacques Cariou and Ernest Meyer. He also competed in eventing, and placed fourth with the French team.

References

1886 births
1957 deaths
French male equestrians
Olympic equestrians of France
Olympic silver medalists for France
Equestrians at the 1912 Summer Olympics
Olympic medalists in equestrian
Sportspeople from Le Mans
Medalists at the 1912 Summer Olympics
20th-century French people